Hoskote (historically known as Ooscota or Ooscata) is a taluk or city in Bangalore Rural District, India. Headquartered at the Hosakote town, it consists of five hoblis - Anugondanahalli, Jadigenahalli, Kasaba, Nandagudi and Sulibele.

History
Hoskote was a Jagir of Maratha warrior Shahaji Raje for around 50 years and also part of Swarajya of Shivaji. The Battle of Ooscata in the First British-Mysore War, on the night of 22-23 August 1768 took place here.

Demographics 
 India census, Hoskote had a population of 56980. Males constitute 52% of the population and females 48%. Hoskote has an average literacy rate of 86.22%, higher than the state average of 75.36%: male literacy is 89.58%, and female literacy is 82.68%. Hoskote has 11.98% of its population under 6 years of age.

References

Cities and towns in Bangalore Rural district

https://www.youtube.com/watch?v=wRd8Yzxq2Gg&t=134s